Max Gustaaf Rood (21 August 1927 in Enschede – 2 December 2001 in Amsterdam) was a Dutch jurist and politician of Democrats 66 (D66).

Rood was a legal scholar on the subject of labour law at Leiden University. He was Minister of the Interior in the Third Van Agt cabinet in 1982.

References 
  Parlement.com biography

1927 births
2001 deaths
Democrats 66 politicians
Dutch consultants
Dutch humanists
Dutch Jews
Dutch legal scholars
Jewish humanists
Jewish Dutch politicians
Jewish scientists
Leiden University alumni
Academic staff of Leiden University
Ministers of the Interior of the Netherlands
People from Enschede
Labour law scholars